Wormuth is a surname. Notable people with the surname include:

Christine Wormuth (born 1969), American defense official and civil servant
Francis D. Wormuth (1909–1980), American lawyer
Frank Wormuth (born 1960), German footballer and manager

See also
Wermuth